The 1990–91 Pepperdine Waves men's basketball team represented Pepperdine University in the 1990–91 NCAA Division I men's basketball season. The team was led by head coach Tom Asbury. The Waves played their home games at the Firestone Fieldhouse and were members of the West Coast Conference. They finished the season 22–9, 13–1 in WCC play to win the regular season conference title by a 4-game margin. After a January 11 home loss to San Diego in the conference opener, Pepperdine was just 6–8 overall. The Waves then went on a 16-game winning streak and won the West Coast Conference tournament to receive the conference's automatic bid to the NCAA tournament. In the opening round, the Waves fell to Seton Hall, 71–51.

Roster

Schedule and results

|-
!colspan=9 style=| Non-conference regular season

|-
!colspan=9 style=| WCC Regular Season

|-
!colspan=9 style=| WCC tournament

|-
!colspan=9 style=| NCAA tournament

Source

Awards and honors
Doug Christie – WCC Player of the Year
Dana Jones – WCC Freshman of the Year
Tom Asbury – WCC Coach of the Year

Pepperdine swept the WCC awards – only the second time a conference team had done so since 1952.

References

Pepperdine Waves men's basketball seasons
Pepperdine
Pepperdine
Pepperdine Waves Men's Basketball
Pepperdine Waves Men's Basketball